Beñat Achiary (born in Saint-Palais, Pyrénées-Atlantiques) is a Basque vocal improviser who lives in the southern France.

He has released three songs from Gherasim Luca's "heroes-limite" on his CD "Seven Circles for Peter". It is released by German label FMP in 2004.

External links
 
 
 
Globalnet
World Music
  LeMonde francetvinfo électroacoustique and Beñat Achiary

French male singers
French-Basque people
Living people
Year of birth missing (living people)
French jazz musicians
People from Lower Navarre